The 2003 Niger State gubernatorial election occurred in Nigeria on April 19, 2003. The PDP nominee Abdulkadir Kure won the election, defeating Mustafa Bello of the PRP.

Abdulkadir Kure emerged PDP candidate. He picked Shem Zagbayi Nuhu as his running mate. Mustafa Bello was the PRP candidate with Jibrin Kolo Saba as his running mate.

Electoral system
The Governor of Niger State is elected using the plurality voting system.

Primary election

PDP primary
The PDP primary election was won by Abdulkadir Kure. He picked Shem Zagbayi Nuhu as his running mate.

PRP primary
The PRP primary election was won by Mustafa Bello. He picked Jibrin Kolo Saba as his running mate.

Results
A total number of 8 candidates registered with the Independent National Electoral Commission to contest in the election.

The total number of registered voters in the state was 1,607,730. Total number of votes cast was 1,044,681, while number of valid votes was 968,934. Rejected votes were 75,747.

References 

Niger State gubernatorial elections
Niger State gubernatorial election
Niger State gubernatorial election
Niger State gubernatorial election